Ian Harrison is a male former international table tennis player from England.

Table tennis career
He competed at the World Table Tennis Championships, in the Swaythling Cup at six consecutive tournaments from 1957-1967.

He played 178 times for England and won the 1960 English Open. In addition he also won eight English National Table Tennis Championships and was England number one.

See also
 List of England players at the World Team Table Tennis Championships

References

English male table tennis players
1939 births
Living people